Zhangixalus yinggelingensis (Yinggeling treefrog) is a species of frog in the family Rhacophoridae endemic to Yinggeling National Nature Reserve, Hainan, China. Its specific name refers to the type locality, Yinggeling, a mountain range in central Hainan.

Description
Zhangixalus yinggelingensis is a medium-sized treefrog with a green body with some white spots.

Distribution
It appears to be a montane species restricted to primary rain forest. It breeds in rainwater pools, which are rare in its mountainous habitat.

Conservation
The species occurs within the Yinggeling National Nature Reserve. The high-altitude montane habitat is relatively undisturbed, but the species is rare and the total area of the habitat is small. IUCN considers Zhangixalus yinggelingensis as "vulnerable". Survey of the reserve has put the estimated total population size at around 3000 frogs.

References

yinggelingensis
Frogs of China
Endemic fauna of Hainan
Amphibians described in 2007